Ubaldo Passalacqua (born May 29, 1918 in Rapolano) was an Italian professional football player.

1918 births
Year of death missing
Italian footballers
Serie A players
Serie B players
A.C.N. Siena 1904 players
Inter Milan players
F.C. Pavia players
Calcio Lecco 1912 players
Association football defenders